Vaituha is a small valley in northwestern Eiao (French Polynesia) which empties into a small bay of the same name.  This bay is the only reliable anchorage on Eiao.

The interior end of the valley, the site of a seasonally spectacular waterfall, rises steeply to the plateau which comprises much of the center of the island, and is one of the few ascents thereto.

References

Landforms of the Marquesas Islands
Valleys of Oceania